Quest is a quarterly and bimonthly Indian journal published between 1954 and 1975 and featuring 20 years of independent India’s publishing history.

History
The publication was founded in 1954 and ceased in 1975 when the government of Indira Gandhi declared in Indian national emergency. It was a product of the Cold War and was created by the Central Intelligence Agency. It was published by the Congress for Cultural Freedom's Indian branch (ICCF), which was led by Minoo Masani and Jayaprakash Narayan. Masani's emphasis of politics, drew the ire of Jawaharlal Nehru and ran into troubles with another publications called Freedom First. The publisher and secretary Narie Oliaji, resigned, complaining that Masani was a political polemicist lacking the ‘intelligence and zeal to represent the Indian anti-communist  intelligentsia’. In 1954 Nicolas Nabokov, the Secretary General of the Congress for Cultural Freedom met Masani and ordered him to separate the cultural and political movements and to gain more support and respect from Indian intellectuals through the creation of a journal, which would be named Quest and devoted exclusively to cultural matters. During its twenty years of history it featured essays, fiction and poetry from writers such as Nirad Chaudhuri, Dilip Chitre, Allen Ginsberg, Jyotirmoy Datta, Mujibur Rehman, Agha Shahid Ali, Jayanta Mahapatra Dom Moraes, Ashis Nandy, Gauri Deshpande, Adil Jussawalla, Mahapatra, A.K. Ramanujan, Saleem Peeradina, Arun Kolatkar, Dilip Chitre, Keki Daruwalla, Anita Desai, Kiran Nagarkar and Abraham Eraly.

Legacy
In 1966, a selection of articles were produced as Ten years of Quest edited by Abu Sayeed Ayyub and Amlan Datta. In 2011 a selection of articles was republished as The best of Quest.

References

Bibliography 
The Best of Quest, edited by Achal Prabhala, Laeeq Futehally and Arshia Sattar, Publisher Tranquebar, India, 2011.

1954 establishments in Bombay State
1975 disestablishments in India
Bi-monthly magazines published in India
Defunct literary magazines
Defunct magazines published in India
The Emergency (India)
English-language magazines published in India
Literary magazines published in India
Quarterly magazines published in India
Magazines established in 1954
Magazines disestablished in 1975
Mass media in Mumbai